Achai Gaon (also known as Ahai of Shabḥa or Aha of Shabḥa, Hebrew: רב אחא [אחאי] משַׁבָּחָא) was a leading scholar during the period of the Geonim, an 8th-century Talmudist of high renown. He enjoys the distinction of being the first rabbinical author known to history after the completion of the Talmud.

As he never actually became the Gaon of either of the two academies, the description "Gaon" attached to his name is a misnomer. When the gaon of Pumbedita died, Aḥa was universally acknowledged to be the fittest man to succeed him. But a personal grudge entertained by the exilarch Solomon bar Ḥasdai induced the latter to pass over Aḥa, and to appoint Natronai ben Nehemiah, Aḥa's secretary, a man considerably his inferior in learning and general acquirements. Angered by this slight, Aḥa left Babylonia and settled in Israel, about 752 or 753, where he remained until his death. Despite Steinschneider's erroneous assertion that he died in 761, the exact date of his death is unknown.

Aḥa's Sheiltot 
The  Sheiltot (שאלתות), also known as Sheiltot d’Rav Achai or Sheiltos, is a collection of homilies (at once learned and popular) on Jewish law and ethics, written by Aḥa.

Place of composition
Aḥa must have written Sheiltot ("Quæstiones" in the sense of disquisitions) in the Land of Israel, for the Aramaic word  was employed in the sense of quæstio (the scientific investigation of a matter) only by the Jews of Israel. "Sheilta" is of Palestinian origin, as is shown by the words buẓina and bisha, which accompany it. S. Mendelsohn is quite correct in his explanation of the term. If, therefore, Simeon Kayyara made use of the "Sheiltot" in his Halakhot Gedolot, as is now certain, the statement of Abraham ibn Daud (according to whom Simeon's work was completed in 750) must be erroneous, since Aḥa did not leave Palestine before 752; and we know that Samuel Gaon, whose successor he was to have become, did not die before 751-752. There are also other evidences of Palestinian influence in Aḥa's work. For example, his treatise indicates that besides the Babylonian Talmud (which naturally was his chief authority) he made frequent use of the Jerusalem Talmud, and of Palestinian Midrashim, Leviticus Rabbah, Ecclesiastes Rabbah, and Tanḥuma, all of which at this time were quite unknown in Babylonia (indeed, even Saadia Gaon, almost two hundred years later, knew comparatively little of them).

Naturally, therefore, Sheiltot has the character of a Palestinian rather than Babylonian work. The contemporary synopses of Babylonian rabbis Yehudai Gaon and Simeon Kayyara confine themselves to important decisions of the Talmud, with the omission of all discussions, and with the addition of short elucidations of words - as these works were intended for scholars rather than common people. Aḥa, in contrast, wrote for thoughtful laymen. Aḥa's treatises upon Biblical and rabbinical laws (numbering 190 or 191, with additions from later writers) were written with special reference to the practice of such moral duties as benevolence, love, respect for parents, and love of truth. They are based upon the order of the parashot, the weekly Torah readings.

Style
The beginning of the fourth "Sheilta," which is based upon the weekly lesson on "Noah," may serve as a specimen of the "Sheiltot." Stealing or robbery was explicitly forbidden to the Israelites; and the divine punishment for the transgression of this command is more severe than for other crimes. Thus, the generation of the Biblical Flood were punished solely on account of their violence, as it is said, "The end of all flesh is come before me; for the earth is filled with violence through them." Aḥa elaborates on this moral condemnation, quoting from the Talmud and Midrash many passages concerning the baseness and godlessness of such crimes. He follows this statement (preceded by the introductory formula, "It is, however, questionable" [beram ẓarik]) with casuistic inquiries; for example, whether it is proper to include in the designation of robbery, for which the Law requires a double restitution, the case of a theft committed in the interest of the victim.

This illustration serves to show that the work is not intended for scholars alone, but also for popular instruction. However, the statement (often repeated since the time of Meiri) that the Sheiltot was a book merely for the instruction of youth is also baseless. More likely, it is a collection of aggadic-halakhic sermons, which Aḥa delivered in Palestine, where certainly he was held in high regard. With the decline of rabbinical knowledge in Palestine, Aḥa would have found but few pupils for pure halakhic instruction; and he therefore added aggadic elements to his lectures, in obedience to the general disposition of the Palestinians, who just then favored aggadah.

This view best explains the word "derashah" (lecture), which occurs about thirty times in the Sheiltot, in connection with the citation of passages from the Talmud. If the Sheiltot were indeed derived from sermons, they may properly be considered, in the form in which they appear, as extracts or abstracts of such sermons, giving the introduction and the conclusion of the original derashah; while of the derashah proper (which no doubt consisted of aggadic and halakhic quotations from Talmud and Midrash) only the heading is mentioned. Considering them as portions of sermons, the frequent repetitions that occur in the Sheiltot are not strange, as this would happen to the best of preachers; while it would be difficult to explain them if they were found in the strictly literary productions of one man. Of course, there can be no certain conclusions concerning the composition of the "Sheiltot" until the manuscript has been examined. The printed text, while it contains much matter of later date, lacks much that, according to older authorities, was formerly included. An accurate edition of the Sheiltot would be very valuable for textual criticism of the Babylonian Talmud, as indeed for Aramaic philology in general, since Aḥa wrote in the Aramaic vernacular.

Impact
Aḥa's work very soon won great esteem, and the work Halakot Gedolot, which does not date from the year 750, but belongs to the oldest literature of the gaonic times, copies no less than 150 passages from the Sheiltot. Sherira Gaon and his son, Hai Gaon, mention the book by title; and it was likewise freely consulted by Rashi and the author of the Arukh.

Editions 
The first edition of the "Sheiltot" appeared in Venice, 1546, and was succeeded by the following:
 An edition with a short commentary by Isaiah Berlin (Dyhernfurth, 1786);
 Another under the title תועפות ראם, with the commentary of Isaac Pardo, Salonica, 1800–01;
 With an extended commentary by Naftali Zvi Yehuda Berlin (Wilna, 1861, 1864, 1867). This edition contains the commentary of Isaiah Berlin, as well as a number of variant readings taken from a manuscript of the year 1460, and a short commentary by Saul ben Joseph, who probably lived in the first half of the 14th century.
 A variorum edition with extensive notes and alternative manuscript readings, along with commentaries from medieval manuscripts, by Samuel K. Mirsky, in five volumes, the final one posthumous, (New York & Jerusalem, 1960-1974).

Manuscripts of the Sheiltot, but with essential divergences from the printed text, are to be found among the Hebrew manuscripts in the Bibliothèque Nationale, Paris, Nos. 308, 309, and in the Bodleian Library, Oxford, Nos. 539, 540, 1317. In the latter library may be found also the hitherto unprinted commentaries by Solomon ben Shabbethai (541), and Johanan ben Reuben (542).

See also
 Full text of the Sheiltot online (Hebrew)

References

 Its bibliography:
Reifmann, in Bet Talmud, iii. 26-29, 52-59, 71-79, 108-117;
S. Buber, ibid. 209-215;
Weiss, Dor, iv. 23-26, and the passages mentioned in the index;
A. Harkavy, Studien und Mittheilungen, iv. xxvi. and p. 373;
Isaac Halevy, Dorot ha-Rishonim, pp. 193, 211-214, Presburg, 1897;
J.L. Rapoport, Bikkure ha-'Ittim, x. 20 et seq.;
Fürst, Literaturblatt d. Orients, xii. 313;
Steinschneider, Cat. Bodl. No. 4330;
A. Jellinek, ḳunṭres ha-Maggid, p. 20, Vienna, 1878;
S. Mendelsohn, in Rev. Ét. Juives, xxxii. 56-62.

Geonim
8th-century rabbis
Year of birth unknown
Year of death unknown
Authors of books on Jewish law